Sims Township may refer to the following places in the United States:

 Sims Township, Grant County, Indiana
 Sims Township, Arenac County, Michigan

Township name disambiguation pages